The 1964–65 Scottish Cup was the 80th staging of Scotland's most prestigious football knockout competition. The Cup was won by Celtic who defeated Dunfermline Athletic in the final.

Preliminary round 1

Replays

Preliminary round 2

Replays

Second Replays

First round

Replays

Second round

Replays

Second Replays

Quarter-finals

Semi-finals

Replays

Final

Teams

See also
1964–65 in Scottish football
1964–65 Scottish League Cup

External links
 Video highlights from official Pathé News archive

Scottish Cup seasons
1964–65 in Scottish football
Scot